Rivers and Tides: Working with Time is a soundtrack by English guitarist, composer and improvisor Fred Frith, of the 2001 Anglo-German documentary film, Rivers and Tides by Thomas Riedelsheimer about the British landscape sculptor Andy Goldsworthy.

Frith composed all the music for the soundtrack and incorporated sound clips of water from the film in the final mix. The music has been described as chamber and features Frith and a German trio of Karoline Höfler, Bernd Settelmeyer and Wolfgang Stryi.

Reception

In a review of the album, AllMusic had this to say of Frith: "Rivers and Tides demonstrates that Frith is not only a skewed pop genius and fearless improviser, but a remarkably empathetic soundtrack composer as well."

Track listing
All tracks composed by Fred Frith.

"Part I" – 10:08
"Part II" – 3:10
"Part III" – 2:22
"Part IV" – 1:25
"Part V" – 4:40
"Part VI" – 4:15
"Part VII" – 11:31
"Part VIII" – 3:20

Personnel
Fred Frith – guitar, samples, violin, piano, berimbao
Karoline Höfler – double bass
Bernd Settelmeyer – percussion
Wolfgang Stryi – soprano saxophone, bass clarinet

Sound and art work
Digitally recorded and mixed at Jankowski Tonstudio, Esslingen, Germany, 8–9 July 2002
Engineered by Peter Hardt
Digital re-mixing and mastering at Bauer Studios, Ludwigsburg, Germany, 30–31 January 2003
Engineered by Adrian von Ripka with Stefan Winter
Art and photography by Andy Goldsworthy
Prints by Peter Postel

References
Frith, Fred. (2003). Rivers and Tides [CD]. Winter & Winter Records.

Albums produced by Fred Frith
Documentary film soundtracks
Fred Frith soundtracks
2003 soundtrack albums
Winter & Winter Records soundtracks